Ng Yong Li (born 6 October 1985) is a Malaysian former professional racing cyclist, who rode professionally between 2005 and 2014 for six different teams. He now works as a directeur sportif for UCI Continental team .

Career
Ng made history in 2007 when he became the first Malaysian rider to sign with European team Vitoria ASC from Portugal. He joined  in 2012.

Major results

2009
 1st Stage 1 Tour of Terengganu
 2nd Overall Tengku Mahkota Pahang Trophy
2013
 1st Stage 2 Satu GP

References

External links

1985 births
Living people
People from Johor
Malaysian male cyclists
Malaysian people of Chinese descent
Cyclists at the 2010 Asian Games
Asian Games competitors for Malaysia
20th-century Malaysian people
21st-century Malaysian people